The 2016 Marburg Open was a professional tennis tournament played on clay courts. It was the seventh edition of the tournament which was part of the 2016 ATP Challenger Tour. It took place in Marburg, Germany between 27 June and 4 July 2016.

Singles main-draw entrants

Seeds

 1 Rankings are as of June 20, 2016.

Other entrants
The following players received wildcards into the singles main draw:
  Sebastian Fanselow
  Jeremy Jahn
  Julian Lenz
  Manuel Peña López

The following player received entry as an alternate:
  Andrea Arnaboldi

The following players received entry from the qualifying draw:
  Germain Gigounon
  Dimitar Kuzmanov
  Sumit Nagal
  Yannik Reuter

The following player received entry as a lucky loser:
  Giovanni Lapentti

Doubles main-draw entrants

Seeds

1 Rankings as of June 20, 2016.

Other entrants
The following pairs received wildcards into the doubles main draw:
  Jan Beusch /  Tadej Turk
  Julian Lenz /  Andreas Mies
  Ivan Sabanov /  Matej Sabanov

The following pair received entry courtesy of a protected ranking into the doubles main draw:
  Gero Kretschmer /  Simon Stadler

Champions

Singles

   Jan Šátral def.  Marco Trungelliti, 6–2, 6–4

Doubles

  James Cerretani  /  Philipp Oswald def.  Miguel Ángel Reyes-Varela /  Max Schnur, 6–3, 6–2

External links
Official Website

Marburg Open
Marburg Open
2016 in German tennis